Berandari Bagaria is a census town within the jurisdiction of the Kulpi police station in the Kulpi CD block in the Diamond Harbour subdivision of the South 24 Parganas district in the Indian state of West Bengal.

Geography

Area overview
Diamond Harbour subdivision is a rural subdivision with patches of urbanization. Only 14.61% of the population lives in the urban areas and an overwhelming 85.39% lives in the rural areas. In the western portion of the subdivision (shown in the map alongside) there are 11 census towns. The entire district is situated in the Ganges Delta and the western part, located on the east bank of the Hooghly River, is covered by the Kulpi Diamond Harbour Plain, which is 5–6 metres above sea level. Archaeological excavations at Deulpota and Harinarayanpur, on the bank of the Hooghly River indicate the existence of human habitation more than 2,000 years ago.

Note: The map alongside presents some of the notable locations in the subdivision. All places marked in the map are linked in the larger full screen map.

Location
Berandari Bagaria is located at

Demographics
According to the 2011 Census of India, Berandari Bagaria had a total population of 10,748 of which 5,462 (51%) were males and 5,286 (49%) were females. There were 1,747 persons in the age range of 0–6 years. The total number of literate persons in Berandari Bagaria was 6,570 (72.99% of the population over 6 years).

Infrastructure
According to the District Census Handbook 2011, Berandari Bagaria covered an area of 4.1202 km2. Among the civic amenities, the protected water supply involved over head tank. It had 834 domestic electric connections. Among the medical facilities, it had a hospital 1.5 km away and 5 medicine shops in the town. Among the educational facilities it had was 5 primary schools. The nearest middle school was at Bagaria 0.5 km away, the nearest secondary school Chandipur 0.5 km away, the  nearest senior secondary school at Hatuganj 2.5 km away, the nearest general degree college at Diamond Harbour 9 km away. It had a polytechnic. Three important commodities it produced were paddy, vegetables and fish.

Transport
Berandari Bagaria is on the National Highway 12.

Kulpi railway station is located nearby.

Healthcare
Kulpi Block Primary Health Centre at Kulpi, with 15 beds, is the major government medical facility in the Kulpi CD block.

References

Cities and towns in South 24 Parganas district